The D'Aquila crime family was one of the earliest crime families to be established in the United States and New York City. The D'Aquilas were based in Manhattan's  Little Italy, originally a crew of the Morello family prior to breaking off and absorbing what was left of the Neapolitan Camorra of Brooklyn. It was a predecessor of the modern-day Gambino crime family.

History 
The D'Aquila family traces back to the Morello crime family. Prior to becoming its own family and establishing dominance in the 1920s was a crew operated by Ignazio Lupo from Palermo. After Lupo merged his crew with the Morello mob to form the Morello crime family he became the underboss of the family. He left leadership of the crew to Salvatore D'Aquila who in the 1910s broke off from the Morello's to start his own family after the arrest of the Morello leadership. In 1916 D'Aquila absorbed what was left of the Brooklyn Camorra after a they went to war with the Morellos to create the D'Aquila crime family.

On October 10, 1928, D'Aquila was shot dead on Avenue A in Manhattan, aged 54. After his murder, D'Aquila's family was taken over by Manfredi Mineo.

References 

Organizations established in the 1910s
1910s establishments in New York City
Organizations disestablished in 1931
1931 disestablishments in New York (state)
Italian-American crime families
Former gangs in New York City